San Cayetano Formation may refer to:
 San Cayetano Formation, Cuba, Jurassic geologic formation of Cuba
 San Cayetano Formation, Colombia, Paleocene geologic formation of Colombia
 San Cayetano Formation, Ecuador, Miocene geologic formation of Ecuador